"Sweetest Thing" is a 1987 song by Irish rock band U2.

Sweetest Thing or The Sweetest Thing may also refer to:

Film
The Sweetest Thing, a 2002 American romantic comedy film directed by Roger Kumble and written by Nancy Pimental

Music
"The Sweetest Thing (I've Ever Known)", a 1975 song performed by Juice Newton and rereleased as a single in 1981 
"The Sweetest Thing" (song), a 1991 song by Carlene Carter
"The Sweetest Thing", a 1997 song on Love Jones (soundtrack)
"Sweetest Thing", a 2000 song by The Cranberries on Bury the Hatchet
"The Sweetest Thing", a song by Camera Obscura from the 2009 album My Maudlin Career

Television episodes
The Sweetest Thing, an episode from the Nick Jr. girls' animated TV show Shimmer and Shine
The Sweetest Thing, an episode from the TV series Kavanaugh QC
The Sweetest Thing, an episode from the TV series Persona
The Sweetest Thing, an episode from the Comedy Central TV series Comedy Central Canned Ham
The Sweetest Thing, an episode from the TV series Pennies from Heaven
The Sweetest Thing, an episode from the cooking TV series The Taste

See also

 "Love Is the Sweetest Thing", a 1932 song written by Ray Noble and performed with his orchestra and Al Bowlly, covered many times